County Hall is a municipal building at Aykley Heads in Durham, County Durham, England. It is the headquarters of Durham County Council.

History
In the first half of the 20th century Durham County Council was based at the Shire Hall in Old Elvet, Durham. After deciding the Shire Hall was inadequate for their needs, county leaders chose to procure a new county headquarters: the site selected had previously been open land forming part of the Aykley Heads Estate which centred around an 18th century mansion that had been built and occupied by the Dixon-Johnson family.

Work on the new building began in 1960: it was designed by Sir Basil Spence in the Brutalist style, was built by John Laing & Son at a cost of £2.75 million and was officially opened by the Duke of Edinburgh on 14 October 1963. The design for the seven-storey building involved continuous bands of glazing with exposed concrete beams above and below: a large mosaic mural depicting local scenes was designed by Clayton and Gelson and installed on the face of the building. Internally, the principal room was the council chamber; a memorial to county council staff who had died in the First and Second World Wars was recovered from the Shire Hall and installed outside the new council chamber.

In March 2020, it was relocated to Bishop Auckland Town Hall.

Replacement
In March 2019, the County Council approved a proposal to move to a smaller new-build facility on the Sands car park at Freeman's Place in the centre of Durham. Of around 1,850 staff currently based in County Hall, 1,000 will be based at the new HQ and approximately 850 will relocate to four council office sites being developed across the county in Crook, Meadowfield, Seaham and Spennymoor. The building works, which are being carried out by Kier Group at a cost of £50 million, are scheduled to be completed in late 2021. Richard Holden, Conservative member of parliament for North-West Durham, has described the new council headquarters as a 'vanity project', questioning the suitability of the location as well as tax increases and cuts to services used to pay for the development.

The county council also announced plans to move the county archives from County Hall to a new history centre at Mount Oswald. Once the moves have taken place, the Council plans to demolish County Hall as part of a masterplan for Aykley Heads to redevelop the wider site as a business park with supporting retail, financial and professional, food and drink, non-residential institutions, and assembly and leisure uses with associated landscaping, multi-storey and surface car parking.

References

Buildings and structures in Durham, England
D
Government buildings completed in 1963